A globe is a three-dimensional scale model of Earth or other astronomical body.

Globe may also refer to:

 The globe, an alternative name for Earth
 Any other spherical or roughly spherical object

Places
Ericsson Globe, previously known as Stockholm Globe Arena, also known as "Globen", a sports arena
Globe Arena (football stadium), football stadium in Morecambe, Lancashire, England
Globe Building (disambiguation)
Globe Cinema (Kolkata), building located in Lindsay Street in Kolkata, West Bengal, India
Globe Derby Park (disambiguation)
Globe Hotel (disambiguation)
Globe Pit, geological site in Essex
Globe Station (disambiguation)
Globe Theatre (disambiguation)
Globe Theatre, the Elizabethan Playhouse associated with William Shakespeare
Shakespeare's Globe, the modern reconstruction of the Elizabethan Playhouse associated with William Shakespeare
 Globe, Arizona, a city in Arizona, United States
 Globe, Kansas, United States
 Globe, Oregon, an unincorporated community, United States
 Globe, Rhode Island, United States
 Globe, Virginia, United States
 Globe, Wisconsin, an unincorporated community, United States
 The Globe, Moorgate, London

Companies and organizations
Globe Telecom, a major telecommunications company in the Philippines
 Globe (St. Paul's Churchyard), a historical bookseller in London
Global Leadership and Organizational Behavior Effectiveness Research Project (Project GLOBE), an international group of social scientists
GLOBE, Global Legislators Organisation for a Balanced Environment
Globe Bikes, a division of Specialized Bicycle Components
Globe Store, a defunct department store based in Scranton, Pennsylvania
Globe International, an Australian surf and skateboard footwear and apparel manufacturer
Global Learning Opportunities in Business Education, a three-school, three-semester international business program
Globe Life and Accident Insurance Company, a life and health insurance company
GLOBE Program, a worldwide hands-on school-based education and science program
Reading globe groups, UK voluntary groups
theGlobe.com, a social networking service of the dotcom boom
 globe.com and bostonglobe.com, the website of The Boston Globe
Globe Studios, a Philippine entertainment production company
Globe Rowing Club, a rowing club in Greenwich, an area in the South East of London, England
Globe Locomotive Works, manufacturer based in Boston, Massachusetts
Globe Aircraft Corporation, American aircraft manufacturer in Fort Worth, Texas
Globe Pequot Press, a book publisher and distributor
Globe Soccer Awards, annual awards given for excellence in football
Globe Shipbuilding, several companies

Newspapers
See: List of newspapers named Globe

Music
Globe (band), a Japanese trance/pop-rock group
Globe (album), a debut album by Globe
The Globe (album), by the band Big Audio Dynamite II
"The Globe" (song), by the band Big Audio Dynamite II
"Globes", a song by Rustie from his album Glass Swords
, a Japanese song by P-Model from the album Landsale (album)

Vessels
CSCL Globe, for a time the largest container ship in the world
Globe (ship), several ships

Other uses
Celestial globe, show the apparent positions of the stars in the sky
BBC One 'Virtual Globe' ident, known as simply 'Globe' or 'Virtual Globe', a television ident for BBC One
Globe (comics), a fictional DC Comics supervillain and enemy of Batman
Globe (human eye), the human eyeball apart from its appendages
Lightglobe, synonym for "incandescent light bulb" in Australian English vernacular
Snow globe, a transparent sphere enclosing a scene or figure

See also
Globus (disambiguation)
Globo (disambiguation)
Global (disambiguation)